Froilan "Nanny" Fernandez (October 25, 1918 – September 19, 1996) was an American professional baseball player.

Fernandez played all, or part of, four seasons in the Major Leagues, primarily as a third baseman, although he also saw significant time as a shortstop and outfielder. After spending the  season with the Indianapolis Indians, the Pirates' top farm team, he spent three seasons in the Pacific Coast League with the Seattle Rainiers and Sacramento Solons.

References

External links

1918 births
1996 deaths
American Association (1902–1997) MVP Award winners
Baseball players from Los Angeles
Boston Braves players
Indianapolis Indians players
Major League Baseball third basemen
Milwaukee Brewers (minor league) players
Pittsburgh Pirates players
Sacramento Solons players
St. Paul Saints (AA) players
San Francisco Seals (baseball) players
Seattle Rainiers players
Yakima Pippins players
People from Wilmington, Los Angeles
American military personnel of World War II